Lindsay E. Sparkes (born August 6, 1950 in North Vancouver, British Columbia as Lindsay Davie) is a Canadian curler. She is a three-time Canadian champion, world champion and Olympic demonstration champion.

In 1976, Sparkes and her team of Dawn Knowles, Robin Klassen, Lorraine Bowles won her first provincial and her first national championship.  In 1979, the team returned to the national championship, and won again. This qualified them for the inaugural 1979 Royal Bank of Scotland World Women's Curling Championship. The team lost in the semi-final to Switzerland.

In 1984, Sparkes and her new team of Linda Moore, Debbie Orr and Laurie Carney won her third provincial title, and finished in 3rd place at that year's national championship (at that point, called the Tournament of Hearts.) The following season, Sparkes and Moore switched positions, and the team won another provincial and went on to claim the 1985 Scott Tournament of Hearts title, beating Newfoundland in the final. At the 1985 World Championships, the team won the gold medal, defeating Scotland in the final. The 1986 Scott Tournament of Hearts would mark the first event where the defending champion could return as Team Canada, and the team lost in the final to Ontario.

The team was chosen by the Canadian Olympic Committee to represent Canada at the 1988 Winter Olympics where curling was a demonstration sport. The team won the gold medal, defeating Sweden in the final.

Sparkes' final appearance at the Hearts was in 1997 as an alternate for the Kelley Owen (Law) rink.

External links
 

World curling champions
Canadian women's curling champions
Canadian women curlers
Curlers from British Columbia
Living people
1950 births
Sportspeople from North Vancouver
Medalists at the 1988 Winter Olympics
Olympic gold medalists for Canada